McGraw House may refer to:

in the United States (by state)
McGraw Ranch, Estes Park, Colorado, listed on the NRHP in Larimer County, Colorado
McGraw House (Bucyrus, Ohio), listed on the NRHP in Crawford County, Ohio
Donald and Ruth McGraw House, Portland, Oregon, listed on the NRHP in Multnomah County, Oregon